Adiponectin (also referred to as GBP-28, apM1, AdipoQ and Acrp30) is a protein hormone and adipokine, which is involved in regulating glucose levels as well as fatty acid breakdown. In humans it is encoded by the ADIPOQ gene and it is produced primarily in adipose tissue, but also in muscle, and even in the brain.

Structure  
Adiponectin is a 244-amino-acid-long polypeptide (protein). There are four distinct regions of adiponectin. The first is a short signal sequence that targets the hormone for secretion outside the cell; next is a short region that varies between species; the third is a 65-amino acid region with similarity to collagenous proteins; the last is a globular domain. Overall this protein shows similarity to the complement 1Q factors (C1Q). However, when the 3-dimensional structure of the globular region was determined, a striking similarity to TNFα was observed, despite unrelated protein sequences.

Function 
Adiponectin is a protein hormone that modulates a number of metabolic processes, including glucose regulation and fatty acid oxidation. Adiponectin is secreted from adipose tissue (and also from the placenta in pregnancy) into the bloodstream and is very abundant in plasma relative to many hormones. High adiponectin levels correlate with a lower risk of diabetes mellitus type 2. Plasma levels of adiponectin are lower in obese subjects than in lean subjects. Many studies have found adiponectin to be inversely correlated with body mass index in patient populations. However, a meta analysis was not able to confirm this association in healthy adults. Circulating adiponectin concentrations increase during caloric restriction in animals and humans, such as in patients with anorexia nervosa. Furthermore, a recent study suggests that adipose tissue within bone marrow, which increases during caloric restriction, contributes to elevated circulating adiponectin in this context.

Transgenic mice with increased adiponectin show reduced adipocyte differentiation and increased energy expenditure associated with mitochondrial uncoupling. The hormone plays a role in the suppression of the metabolic derangements that may result in type 2 diabetes, obesity, atherosclerosis, non-alcoholic fatty liver disease (NAFLD) and an independent risk factor for metabolic syndrome. Adiponectin in combination with leptin has been shown to completely reverse insulin resistance in mice. Adiponectin enhances insulin sensitivity primarily though regulation of fatty acid oxidation and suppression of hepatic glucose production .

Adiponectin is secreted into the bloodstream where it accounts for approximately 0.01% of all plasma protein at around 5-10 μg/mL (mg/L). In adults, plasma concentrations are higher in females than males, and are reduced in diabetics compared to non-diabetics. Weight reduction significantly increases circulating concentrations.

Adiponectin automatically self-associates into larger structures. Initially, three adiponectin molecules bind together to form a homotrimer. The trimers continue to self-associate and form hexamers or dodecamers. Like the plasma concentration, the relative levels of the higher-order structures are sexually dimorphic, where females have increased proportions of the high-molecular weight forms. Recent studies showed that the high-molecular weight form may be the most biologically active form regarding glucose homeostasis. High-molecular-weight adiponectin was further found to be associated with a lower risk of diabetes with similar magnitude of association as total adiponectin. However, coronary artery disease has been found to be positively associated with high molecular weight adiponectin, but not with low molecular weight adiponectin.

Adiponectin exerts some of its weight reduction effects via the brain. This is similar to the action of leptin; adiponectin and leptin can act synergistically.

Adiponectin promoted synaptic and memory function in the brain. Humans with lower levels of adiponectin have reduced cognitive function.

Receptors 

Adiponectin binds to a number of receptors. So far, two receptors have been identified with homology to G protein-coupled receptors, and one receptor similar to the cadherin family:
 Adiponectin receptor 1 (AdipoR1)
 Adiponectin receptor 2 (AdipoR2)
 T-cadherin - CDH13

These have distinct tissue specificities within the body and have different affinities to the various forms of adiponectin. AdipoR1 is enriched in skeletal muscle, whereas AdipoR2 is enriched in liver. Six months of exercise has been shown in rats to double muscle AdipoR1.

The receptors affect the downstream target AMP kinase, an important cellular metabolic rate control point. Expression of the receptors is correlated with insulin levels, as well as reduced in mouse models of diabetes, particularly in skeletal muscle and adipose tissue.

In 2016, the University of Tokyo announced that it would launch an investigation into claims of fabrication of AdipoR1 and AdipoR2 identification data, as accused by an anonymous person/group called Ordinary_researchers.

Discovery 
Adiponectin was first characterised in 1995 in differentiating 3T3-L1 adipocytes (Scherer PE et al.). In 1996 it was characterised in mice as the mRNA transcript most highly expressed in adipocytes.  In 2007, adiponectin was identified as a transcript highly expressed in preadipocytes (precursors of fat cells) differentiating into adipocytes.

The human homologue was identified as the most abundant transcript in adipose tissue. Contrary to expectations, despite being produced in adipose tissue, adiponectin was found to be decreased in obesity. This downregulation has not been fully explained. The gene was localised to chromosome 3q27, a region highlighted as affecting genetic susceptibility to type 2 diabetes and obesity. Supplementation by differing forms of adiponectin was able to improve insulin control, blood glucose and triglyceride levels in mouse models.

The gene was investigated for variants that predispose to type 2 diabetes. Several single nucleotide polymorphisms in the coding region and surrounding sequence were identified from several different populations, with varying prevalences, degrees of association and strength of effect on type 2 diabetes. Berberine, an isoquinoline alkaloid, has been shown to increase adiponectin expression, which partly explains its beneficial effects on metabolic disturbances. Mice fed the omega-3 fatty acids eicosapentaenoic acid (EPA) and docosahexaenoic acid (DHA) have shown increased plasma adiponectin. Curcumin, capsaicin, gingerol, and catechins have also been found to increase adiponectin expression.

Phylogenetic distribution includes expression in birds and fish.

Metabolic

Adiponectin effects:

 glucose flux
 decreased gluconeogenesis
 increased glucose uptake
 lipid catabolism
 β-oxidation
 triglyceride clearance
 protection from endothelial dysfunction (important facet of atherosclerotic formation)
 insulin sensitivity
 weight loss
 control of energy metabolism.
 upregulation of uncoupling proteins
 reduction of TNF-alpha
 promotion of reverse cholesterol transport

Regulation of adiponectin
 Obesity is associated with decreased adiponectin.
The exact mechanism of regulation is unknown, but adiponectin could be regulated by post-translational mechanisms in cells.

Hypoadiponectinemia 

A low level of adiponectin is an independent risk factor for developing:

Metabolic syndrome
Diabetes mellitus
Dyslipidemia
Obesity
Hypertension

Other 

Lower levels of adiponectin are associated with ADHD in adults.

Adiponectin levels were found to be increased in rheumatoid arthritis patients responding to DMARDs or TNF inhibitor therapy.

A low adiponectin to leptin ratio has been found in patients with COVID-19 pneumonia compared to healthy controls.

Exercise induced release of adiponectin increased hippocampal growth and led to antidepressive symptoms in mice.

Several studies have found a positive correlation in caffeine consumption and increased adiponectin levels, although the mechanism for this is unknown and requires more research.

As a medication target 
Circulating levels of adiponectin can indirectly be increased through lifestyle modifications and certain medications such as statins.

A small molecule adiponectin receptor AdipoR1 and AdipoR2 agonist, AdipoRon, has been reported. In 2016, the University of Tokyo announced it was launching an investigation into anonymously made claims of fabricated and falsified data on AdipoR1, AdipoR2, and AdipoRon.

Extracts of sweet potatoes have been reported to increase levels of adiponectin and thereby improve glycemic control in humans. However, a systematic review concluded there is insufficient evidence to support the consumption of sweet potatoes to treat type 2 diabetes mellitus.

Adiponectin is apparently able to cross the blood-brain-barrier. However, conflicting data on this issue exist. Adiponectin has a half-life of 2.5 hours in humans.

References

External links 
 
 
 

Adiponectin receptor agonists
Peptide hormones
Proteins
Obesity